Lyonpo Jigme Yoser Thinley (Dzongkha: འཇིགས་མེད་འོད་ཟེར་འཕྲིན་ལས་; Wylie: 'Jigs-med 'Od-zer 'Phrin-las) (born 9 September 1952) is a Bhutanese politician who was Prime Minister of Bhutan from 20 July 1998 to 9 July 1999, 30 August 2003 to 18 August 2004 and 9 April 2008 to 28 April 2013.

Biography
Thinley was born in Bumthang and joined the civil service in 1976 upon receiving a graduate degree from The Pennsylvania State University. He received an undergraduate degree from St. Stephen’s College, Delhi. In February 1987, Thinley was awarded the title of Dasho and the Red Scarf, and in 1990, under the zonal system, he became administrator of the Eastern Zone. He then became secretary in the Ministry of Home Affairs in 1992 before being appointed as Deputy Minister of Home Affairs in January 1994, at which time he was also awarded the Orange Scarf. Later in 1994, he was appointed as Bhutan's Permanent Representative to the United Nations office and other international organizations in Geneva.

Prior to the beginning of Bhutanese democracy, he was Prime Minister twice, from 20 July 1998, to 9 July 1999, and from 30 August 2003, to 20 August 2004. During this period, chairmanship of the council was based on rotation once per year, with the order of rotation decided by the number of votes secured during the time of election to the council. Jigme was also the Minister of Foreign Affairs of Bhutan from 1998 until 2003 and subsequently served as Minister of Home and Cultural Affairs.

On 2 June 1999, Thinley was awarded the Druk Thuksey and Silver Jubilee medals. On 6 November 2008, Thinley was awarded the Coronation medal. On 17 December 2008, Thinley was awarded the Druk Wangyal medal - one of the highest medals of honor - for excellence in carrying out his duties.

In March 2008, he stood as leader of the political party Druk Phuensum Tshogpa in Bhutan's first democratic election. His party won 45 of the 47 seats in the National Assembly of Bhutan, which enabled Jigme Thinley to become Bhutan's first ever elected Prime Minister. He took office on 9 April.

Thinley blamed the global economic crisis of 2008–2009 on "insatiable human greed" and stressed the need to instead focus on the Bhutanese notion of gross national happiness. His government works to base its policies on gross national happiness rather than purely economic considerations.

In July 2009, Thinley became a member of the SNV Netherlands Development Organisation's International Advisory Board to contribute his experience to the organisation's poverty reduction and sustainable development work.

He received an honorary doctorate from KIIT University in 2012, other recipients at the ceremony were eminent economist, Baidyanath Misra, and Ghulam Farooq Wardak, the then Education Minister of Afghanistan. 

On 3 February 2014, Thinley received an honorary degree from the University of Louvain (UCLouvain) in Belgium along with Lawrence Lessig and Denis Mukwege.

His son Palden married Princess Ashi Kesang Choden Wangchuck on 11 November 2008.

His wife Aum Rinsy Dem died in Bangkok on 28 November 2018.

Honours
  :
  The Royal Red Scarf (February 1987).
  The Royal Orange Scarf (January 1994).
  Member of the Royal Order of Bhutan (2 June 1999).
  Commemorative Silver Jubilee Medal of King Jigme Singye (2 June 1999).
  King Jigme Khesar Investiture Medal (6 November 2008).
  Centenary of the Monarchy Commemorative Medal (6 November 2008).
  Member of the Order of Great Victory of the Thunder Dragon (17 December 2008).

References

External links

  (63rd session of the United Nations General Assembly)
 

|-

|-

|-

|-

1952 births
Druk Phuensum Tshogpa politicians
Foreign ministers of Bhutan
Living people
People from Bumthang District
Pennsylvania State University alumni
Permanent Representatives of Bhutan to the United Nations
Prime Ministers of Bhutan
Druk Phuensum Tshogpa MNAs
Culture ministers of Bhutan
Interior ministers of Bhutan